The House of Frohburg (also Froburg) was a noble family in medieval Switzerland, with possessions in what is now the canton of Solothurn. They originate in the Wigger basin, near Zofingen. In the 10th century, they built Frohburg Castle on a hill near Trimbach.
They had the title of counts from the later 11th century. They ruled the lands between Olten and Solothurn, and took parts of Aargau and Sisgau as fief from the bishop of Basel.
They reached the peak of their power in the later 12th and early 13th century, building a number of castles, and founding towns such as Aarburg, Liestal, Olten (then a fortified river crossing), Waldenburg, Wiedlisbach and Zofingen. They also founded Schöntal Abbey near Waldenburg.
The House of Frohburg was divided into three branches, Neu-Homberg, Waldenburg and Zofingen, in c. 1250.
The Zofingen branch was extinct in 1307, followed by the Neo-Homberg one in 1325. The Waldenburg branch survived for another 40 years but declined in influence, being forced to sell most of its possessions, most of them to the ascending House of Habsburg.
The last count of Frohburg was Hermann VI (d. 1367 as abbot of St. Urban's Abbey).

Counts of Frohburg

House of Frohburg

See also
 House of Homberg

References

Bibliography
 
 Hektor Ammann, Die Frohburger und ihre Städtegründungen Zürich, 1934.
 
 

Swiss nobility
Medieval Switzerland
Canton of Solothurn